Alexander Arnoldovich Freiman (August 22, 1879, Warsaw – January 19, 1968, Leningrad) was a Polish-Soviet researcher of the Iranian languages.

Literary works
The editor of Sogdiysky sbornik, 1934
Zadachi iranskoy filologii, 1946
Chorezmsky yazyk.  Materially i issledovaniya, 1959
Osetinsko-russko-nemetsky slovar', 3 vols., 1927–1934

External links 
 https://web.archive.org/web/20060820170327/http://www.vgd.ru/F/francuzv.htm
 http://dic.academic.ru/dic.nsf/enc3p/311782
 http://vslovar.org.ru/v2/60031.html

Linguists of Iranian languages
Writers from Warsaw
Polish emigrants to the Soviet Union
Linguists from Poland
Polish philologists
Linguists from the Soviet Union
20th-century linguists
1879 births
1968 deaths